Lahr may refer to:

Places 
 Lahr/Schwarzwald, a town in Baden-Württemberg
 Canadian Forces Base Lahr, now known as Black Forest Airport, a former military airport located in Lahr
 Lahr, Bitburg-Prüm, a municipality in the district Bitburg-Prüm, Rhineland-Palatinate
 Hüttingen bei Lahr, a municipality in the district of Bitburg-Prüm, in Rhineland-Palatinate
 Lahr (Hunsrück), a municipality in the district Rhein-Hunsrück-Kreis, Rhineland-Palatinate
 Burglahr, a municipality in the district of Altenkirchen, in Rhineland-Palatinate
 Laer, a German municipality in the district of Steinfurt, in North Rhine-Westphalia

Other uses 
 Lahr (surname)

See also 
 Lars, common name
 Laar (disambiguation) (Dutch form)